Bill Waldron (born 11 February 1935) is a former  Australian rules footballer who played with St Kilda in the Victorian Football League (VFL).

Notes

External links 

Living people
1935 births
Australian rules footballers from Victoria (Australia)
St Kilda Football Club players